Events in the year 1850 in Belgium.

Incumbents
Monarch: Leopold I
Head of government: Charles Rogier

Events

 Sint-Lodewijkscollege established in Lokeren
 14 February – Treaty of commerce and navigation with the Russian Empire signed in Berlin.
 5 May – National Bank of Belgium founded
 27 May - Provincial elections
 11 June – Partial legislative elections
 25 July – Scourmont Priory established
 4 August – Mediation by the King of the Belgians leads to the restoration of diplomatic relations between Spain and the United Kingdom.
 25 September – King Leopold lays the first stone of the Congress Column in Brussels
 31 October – Treaty of commerce and navigation with Bolivia signed in Brussels

Publications
Periodicals
 Almanach de poche de Bruxelles
 Almanach royal officiel
 Annuaire de la noblesse de Belgique, edited by Isidore de Stein d'Altenstein (Brussels, Muquardt)
 Recueil des lois et arrêtés royaux de la Belgique, vol. 21 (Brussels, E. Devroye).
 Revue de Bruxelles ceases publication

Books
 Félix Victor Goethals, Dictionnaire généalogique et héraldique des familles nobles du Royaume de Belgique, vol. 3. 
 Adolphe Joanne, Voyage en Orient (Ixelles lez Bruxelles, Delevingne & Callewaert)
 Edouard Mary, Epîtres en vers sur la Belgique.
 Jean-Joseph Thonissen, Le Socialisme et ses promesses (2 volumes)
 Pierre-Joseph van Beneden, Recherches sur la faune littorale de Belgique: Les vers cestoïdes ou acotyles (Brussels, Hayez)

Art and architecture
Paintings
 Jan August Hendrik Leys, Divine Service in Holland

Births
 5 January – Theodoor Verstraete, artist (died 1907)
 30 January – Emma De Vigne, painter (died 1898)
 20 February – Eugène Joors, painter (died 1910)
 20 March – Marietta Hannon Rousseau, mycologist (died 1926)
 14 April – Fredegand Cogels, politician (died 1932)
 9 May – Fernande de Mertens, painter (died 1924)
 8 October – Léon Herbo, painter (died 1907)
 4 November – Jules Bilmeyer, architect (died 1920)
 17 November – Hippolyte d'Ursel, politician and historian (died 1937)
 29 December – Frans Van Leemputten, painter (died 1914)

Deaths
 29 April – Charles de Brouckère (born 1757), politician
 5 September – Paul-François Huart-Chapel (born 1770), industrialist and politician
 11 October – Queen Louise (born 1812)

References

 
Belgium
Years of the 19th century in Belgium
1850s in Belgium
Belgium